St. John of Beverley (abbreviated SJB)  is a DepEd-recognized primary, secondary, and tertiary educational institution located in Novaliches Town Proper, Quezon City, Philippines. It was established and currently led by Dr. Erlinda P. Mercado in 1995. The name of school was inspired by Saint John of Beverley.

References

External links 
 St. John of Beverley Official Website
 Official St. John of Beverley Official Facebook Page

Schools in Quezon City